New Moon: The Graphic Novel is a comic book by Young Kim, an adaptation of the 2006 novel New Moon by Stephenie Meyer. Volume 1 was released on April 30, 2013. The release date for Volume 2 had been delayed indefinitely. It is currently unknown how many more volumes will be published.

Plot summary

This graphic novel takes place on Bella Swan's 18th birthday, months after James's death.

During her birthday party orchestrated by Alice Cullen, Bella gets a paper cut and Jasper Hale goes frantic, causing a dangerous scene where Bella's injuries worsen. Edward Cullen decides to leave Forks with his family to keep her safe, but Bella falls into a long severe depression because of his departure.

Months later, Bella reluctantly goes for a night out with Jessica Stanley, and stumbles across a group of seemingly dangerous teens, which reminds her of the time she almost got attacked by a different gang. She discovers that by putting her life in danger, she could hear Edward's voice in her head and goes on adrenaline-filled expeditions. On one of these attempts, she visits Jacob Black and asks him to help fix a pair of broken motorcycles. He agrees and the two begin to spend much time together. Jacob becomes the touchstone that temporarily relieves her of her heartache, and he promises to be there for her always. That is until he unexpectedly gets sick and stops contacting her.

She relocates the meadow and finds herself in a life-threatening confrontation with Laurent, who decides to kill her before Victoria does. Suddenly, a group of bear-sized wolves come into the clearing and chase the vampire away.

Part 2
In Volume 2, 
Bella decides to go to visit Jacob Black to investigate on why he’s been avoiding her. He tells her to stay away or she will get hurt. Later that evening, Bella dreams that Victoria is coming to get her but awakens when Jacob comes to visit. He tells her to remember the story he told her on the day of her first day at La Push, he leaves and Bella immediately remembers, suspecting that he is a werewolf. 

The next day, Bella goes to La Push to visit Jacob and confront him but fails to do so, she eventually gets into a life-threatening confrontation with Sam Uley’s Pack. Jacob saves Bella from getting eaten by Paul in wolf form and Jacob and Paul fight it out. Sam immediately tells Quil and Embry to take Bella back to Emily Young, his fiancé’s place. 

While there, Bella meets Emily and decides to go walk on the beach with Jacob, she learns that he is in fact a werewolf but also he is not the reason for killing all the humans. She learns that the wolves killed Laurent and that their next target is Victoria. Bella then tells Jacob that Victoria is after her for revenge of what Edward did to James, Jacob eventually agrees to tell the pack to help protect Bella and hunt down Victoria. 

While Jacob and the Wolf Pack go hunt for Victoria and Charlie and Harry hunt for Jacob, Bella realizes that she needs to be able to hear Edward’s voice again, so she decides to go Cliff jumping. Bella hears his voice and reminds him that he wanted her to be human so she jumps off the cliff, while in the water Bella sees Victoria swimming after her but she tries to escape and hits her on a rock and falls unconscious. 
She is pulled out of the water by Jacob and learns of Harry Clearwater’s death. 

Jacob eventually takes Bella back home and then she learns that one of The Cullens has come back to Forks. Jacob tries to get to her to go with him but she refuses. Bella goes into her house to find Alice Cullen, Edward’s sister, shocked and confused as to how Bella is alive. Bella tells her that Jacob is a werewolf and that Laurent and Victoria have been around Forks, trying to kill Bella. Jacob comes into Bella’s house to make sure she is safe. Jacob learns that only Alice is back in Forks and none of the other Cullens are coming back. 
Jacob and Bella share a moment, an almost kiss when they’re interrupted by a phone call. Alice returns to tell Bella that it was Edward on the phone and that he thinks Bella is dead. She also reveals that Edward is going to The Volturi to die. 

Alice and Bella decide to leave Forks to go to Italy to save Edward from exposing himself as a Vampire to the humans. Bella eventually gets to him in time and reveals to him that she’s alive. Bella and Edward reconcile until two of The Volturi Guards, Felix and Demetri order Edward to have a word with Aro. Jane, another member of the guard also arrives to escort Edward, Bella, and Alice to The Volturi Leaders. Bella, Edward, and Alice arrive and meet Aro; Aro reads Edward’s mind and tries to get Bella to see if she immune to his gift, which fails. Jane tries to use her gift to inflict pain on Bella as well but also fails. Aro eventually decides that Bella, a human, who knows too much about vampires and their existence must be either killed or turned into a vampire herself. Edward refuses to make her immortal so Aro decides to kill her, not before Alice reveals that Bella will become a vampire and that she has already ‘seen’ it happen. Alice shows Aro the vision of Bella as a vampire. After Alice shows Aro the vision, Aro lets the three of them go to make their preparations of Bella’s transformation and to make sure they follow through with it as they do not give second chances. Bella, Edward, and Alice and the rest of The Cullens decide to return to Forks. 

Edward apologies to Bella for leaving and promises he will never fail her again. Charlie learns that Bella left the country without his permission and grounds her for life. Bella learns that Edward still thinks that there is a way to keep The Volturi from knowing that Bella stays human. Infuriated that Edward refuses to make Bella immortal, Bella goes to The Cullen’s house to hold a vote on whether or not she should become a vampire. Most of the Cullens vote yes in favor except for Rosalie and Edward. Carlisle tells Bella he will turn her into a vampire after her high school graduation. 

On the way home, Bella tells Edward that instead of Carlisle turning her, she would rather Edward do it. They return to Bella’s house to find Jacob there. Edward and Bella talk to Jacob out in the woods outside near Bella’s house and Edward thanks Jacob for keeping her alive while he left. Jacob reminds Edward about a key point in the treaty: if one of The Cullens bites a human, the treaty is over. Bella reveals that if she chooses to become a vampire then Jacob won’t have attack, furious, Jacob tells Bella she is not going to become one of the Cullens and if she does, he and Sam’s Pack will kill her and The Cullens all together. 
Bella tells Jacob that she chooses Edward and always have chose Edward to be her mate. Edward and Jacob almost get into a fight until Bella stops it from getting ugly. Jacob leaves, distraught at Bella’s decision. Edward tells Bella that she shouldn’t become immortal but Bella reminds him that this is what she wants. The book ends with Edward promising that he will change Bella into a vampire on one condition, if she marries him first. 

This volume's release had been delayed infinitely. Current estimated release date in the US on July 21, 2020.

References

2013 graphic novels
2013 comics debuts
American graphic novels
Comics based on fiction
Works based on Twilight (novel series)
Yen Press titles
Vampires in comics
Adaptations of works by Stephenie Meyer
Fantasy graphic novels